Caristanius pellucidella is a species of snout moth in the genus Caristanius. It was described by Ragonot in 1889 and is known from Puerto Rico.

References

Moths described in 1889
Phycitinae